Among the recipients of the honorary citizenship of the City of Reykjavík, Iceland are:

Honorary Citizens of the City of Reykjavík

References

Honorary citizens of Reykjavík
Reykjavík